Kim Ok-Gil (1921–1990) was a South Korean politician.

She was appointed as Minister of Education in 1979.

References

20th-century South Korean women politicians
20th-century South Korean politicians
Place of birth missing
Women government ministers of South Korea
1921 births
1990 deaths